St Helens is a town in the Shire of Moyne, in South Western Victoria, Australia. 
The local economy is largely agriculture.

References

Towns in Victoria (Australia)